Grant Dale Kemp is a South African-born Hong Kong international rugby union player, currently playing with the Hong Kong national team and Valley in the Hong Kong Premiership. His regular position is prop.

Career

References

South African rugby union players
Southern Kings players
SWD Eagles players
Living people
1988 births
Rugby union props
Rugby union players from Cape Town
South African people of British descent
Alumni of Wynberg Boys' High School
Valley RFC players
South African expatriate sportspeople in Hong Kong
Expatriate rugby union players in Hong Kong
South African expatriate rugby union players
Naturalised citizens of the People's Republic of China in Hong Kong
Naturalised sports competitors